Ion Hortopan ( in Câmpina – 1980) was a Romanian male former weightlifter, who competed in the 52 kg category and represented Romania at international competitions. He won the bronze medal in the snatch at the 1973 World Weightlifting Championships lifting 100.0 kg. He participated at the 1972 Summer Olympics in the 52 kg event.

References

External links
 

1941 births
1980 deaths
Romanian male weightlifters
World Weightlifting Championships medalists
People from Câmpina
Olympic weightlifters of Romania
Weightlifters at the 1972 Summer Olympics
Date of death unknown
20th-century Romanian people